Romanovka may refer to:
Romanovka stratovolcano, a stratovolcano in central Kamchatka
Romanovka (inhabited locality), name of several inhabited localities in Russia
Romanovka, Kyrgyzstan, a village in Chuy Region, Kyrgyzstan
Pristan (air base), known as Romanovka West by Western intelligence, an air base in Primorsky Krai, Russia